Carlos Da Cruz (born 20 December 1974 in Paris) is a French former professional road bicycle racer. In his 11-year career, he rode for BigMat-Auber93 between 1997 and 2000, Festina in 2001 and then for UCI ProTeam Française des Jeux between 2002 and 2007.

Major results

 Circuit de la Sarthe - 1 stage & Overall (2003)
 Settimana Lombarda - 1 stage (2000)
  World Team Pursuit Championship (1997)
  Amateur Team Pursuit Champion (1995)

External links 

French male cyclists
1974 births
Living people
Cyclists from Paris